Sâniacob may refer to several villages in Romania:

 Sâniacob, a village in Lechința Commune, Bistrița-Năsăud County
 Sâniacob, a village in Ațintiș Commune, Mureș County